W. G. Grace played mostly for Gloucestershire County Cricket Club and Marylebone Cricket Club (MCC) during the five seasons from 1887 to 1891. He also represented England in Test cricket.

1887 English cricket season

Grace's best return in the 1880s was 2,062 runs in 1887 with six centuries.

Grace made 24 first-class appearances in 1887, scoring 2,062 runs, with a highest score of 183 not out, at an average of 54.26 with 6 centuries and 8 half-centuries. In the field, he took 21 catches and 97 wickets with a best analysis of 7–53. His bowling average was 21.46; he had 5 wickets in an innings 7 times and 10 wickets in a match once.

1888 English cricket season

In 1888, he scored two centuries in one match v Yorkshire (148 and 153) and labelled this "my champion match".

Grace made 33 first-class appearances in 1888, scoring 1,886 runs, with a highest score of 215, at an average of 32.51 with 4 centuries and 7 half-centuries. In the field, he took 34 catches and 93 wickets with a best analysis of 6–74. His bowling average was 18.18; he had 5 wickets in an innings 6 times.

1889 English cricket season

Grace had reduced his bowling somewhat in the last few seasons and he became an occasional bowler only from 1889.

Grace made 24 first-class appearances in 1889, scoring 1,396 runs, with a highest score of 154, at an average of 32.46 with 3 centuries and 7 half-centuries. In the field, he took 22 catches and 44 wickets with a best analysis of 8–37. His bowling average was 23.18; he had 5 wickets in an innings twice and 10 wickets in a match once.

1890 English cricket season

Grace made 30 first-class appearances in 1890, scoring 1,476 runs, with a highest score of 109 not out, at an average of 28.38 with 1 century and 9 half-centuries. In the field, he took 31 catches and 61 wickets with a best analysis of 6–68. His bowling average was 19.37; he had 5 wickets in an innings 3 times.

1891 English cricket season

Injury problems, particularly a bad knee, took their toll in the early 1890s and Grace had his worst season in 1891 when he scored no centuries and could only average 19.76.

Grace made 24 first-class appearances in 1891, scoring 771 runs, with a highest score of 72 not out, at an average of 19.76 with 0 centuries and 5 half-centuries. In the field, he took 19 catches and 58 wickets with a best analysis of 7–38. His bowling average was 16.77; he had 5 wickets in an innings 5 times and 10 wickets in a match once.

References

External links
 CricketArchive – W.G. Grace

Bibliography

 
 
 
 
 
 
 
 
 

English cricket seasons in the 19th century
1887